Sevogle Airport , near the Miramichi River and the former Heath Steele Mines, is operated by the Department of Natural Resources, Government of New Brunswick, Canada. Prior notice is required before landing.

References

Registered aerodromes in New Brunswick
Transport in Northumberland County, New Brunswick
Buildings and structures in Northumberland County, New Brunswick